Habitat (1966–1987) was an American-bred,  British-trained Thoroughbred racehorse and sire. In a racing career which lasted from April until October 1969, the colt ran eight times and won five races. Unraced as a two-year-old, he proved to be the best European miler of 1969, winning the Lockinge Stakes and the Wills Mile in England and travelling to France to win the Prix Quincey and the Prix du Moulin. He was then retired to stud where he became an outstandingly successful sire of racehorses and broodmares.

Background
Habitat was a bay horse standing 16.1 hands high bred in Kentucky by Nuckols Bros. He was sired by Sir Gaylord, a half brother to Secretariat and a successful racehorse and sire in his own right: at the time of Habitat's racing career he was at the height of his reputation as a breeding stallion, having sired the 1968 Epsom Derby winner Sir Ivor. Habitat's dam. Little Hut, won five races and produced several other winners including Northfields (by Northern Dancer) who won the Louisiana Derby and became a successful sire in Europe and South Africa.

As a yearling, Habitat was sent to the Keeneland Sales where he was bought for $105,000 by the American businessman Charles Engelhard. The colt was sent to England to be trained by Fulke Johnson Houghton at Blewbury in Berkshire.

Racing career
Habitat was slow to mature and did not appear as a two-year-old in 1968. In April 1969 he made his debut in the Royal Stakes, a trial race for The Derby at Sandown Park and finished unplaced. He next finished second in a minor race at Windsor Racecourse and then recorded his first win when taking the Willows Plate at Haydock Park by five lengths in May. Later that month, Habitat was moved up in class and matched against older horses in the Lockinge Stakes over one mile at Newbury Racecourse. Ridden by the Australian jockey Ron Hutchinson, he started at odds of 10/1 and won by one and a half lengths from a strong field which included, Jimmy Reppin (Sussex Stakes), Tower Walk (Nunthorpe Stakes), Lorenzaccio and Wolver Hollow (Eclipse Stakes).

In June at Royal Ascot, Habitat was matched against the 2000 Guineas winner Right Tack in the St. James's Palace Stakes. Ridden by Lester Piggott, he was beaten half a length by the classic winner in a rough and unsatisfactory race which resulted in Piggott receiving a seven-day suspension from riding. In August Habitat was sent to France for the Prix Quincey over 1600 metres at Deauville Racecourse and won from the Cheveley Park Stakes winner Mige. Less than a week later he returned to England to contest the Wills Mile at Goodwood Racecourse. Ridden again by Piggott, he won at odds of 9/2 from Lucyrowe (Coronation Stakes) and Jimmy Reppin. On his final start, Habitat returned to France for the Prix du Moulin at Longchamp Racecourse on 5 October. He won by two lengths from Boysie Boy, with Right Tack and Welsh Pageant (Queen Anne Stakes) among the unplaced runners.

At the end of the year, Habitat was sold to a syndicate of breeders for £400,000 and retired to stud.

Assessment and honours
In 1969 Habitat was awarded a rating of 134 by the independent Timeform organisation, making him their highest-rated horse of the season. They chose however, to give their Horse of the Year Award to the Prix de l'Arc de Triomphe winner Levmoss who had been rated on 133.

Stud record
Habitat stood as a stallion at the Grangewilliam Stud in County Kildare Ireland and was an immediate success. His Group One winners included Bassenthwaite, Brocade, Distant Relative, Flying Water, Habat, Habibti, Hittite Glory, Marwell, Rose Bowl, Sigy, Steinlen, Double Form, Smokey Lady and Steel Heart.

Habitat was also an outstandingly successful sire of broodmares, being the damsire of Reference Point, Shaamit, Barathea, Grand Lodge and Las Meninas. He was the Leading broodmare sire in Great Britain & Ireland in 1987, 1994 and 1996.

Despite his success as a stallion, Habitat has not been considered an enduring influence as few of his sons made any impact at stud.

Habitat was euthanized at Grangewilliam on 23 June 1987.

Pedigree

References

1966 racehorse births
1987 racehorse deaths
Racehorses bred in Kentucky
Racehorses trained in the United Kingdom
British Champion Thoroughbred broodmare sires
Thoroughbred family 4-r
Chefs-de-Race